Tegano is a village in the Solomon Islands, on Rennell Island in the Rennell and Bellona province. This village has a guest house in European style and is very popular.

Location
The village is located near the west end of Lake Tegano to the East of Nuipani, with access by boat or a 45-minute walk from Nuipani.

Population
120 people approx

Religion
Seventh-day Adventist Church

Policing

Generally policing is serviced by the Tigoa police station as well as a local Provincial government employed area Constable.

Populated places in Rennell and Bellona Province